Paul Cohen (born 4 June 1962) is an industrial designer. Paul has won numerous design awards, including becoming an Overall Winner of an Australian Design Award, Good Design Award USA, and Red Dot Germany.

Career 

After graduation, Paul joined a leading product design consultancy in Sydney. His training included working for several years under master Sony designer Masahiro Takahashi. In 2000, he jointly began Cube Sydney, and in 2004 expanded into Cube Design China. Cube is now a global business with an international client base.

In 2003, Paul created several unique designs for EcoSmart Fire, one of which has featured by Bang and Olufsen in Paris. Working with Breville in 2004, Paul helped to create a range of electric home appliances, including working on the Breville Ikon kettle and Breville variable temp kettle, both of which are now the largest selling kettles in the world (in excess of 1.5 million).

Many of his designs have been showcased on the covers of and within the pages of magazines, including Belle, Vogue and Wallpaper.

Paul has also worked with Midea and Breo.

In 2008, Paul began a new direction in his new career, expanding business into Shenzhen China. There, he was the guest of the Red Dot in China. Paul is also active in a variety of exhibitions, such as the International Creative Design Expo(Shenzhen). He currently divides his time between Australia and China.

Design

Besides the EcoSmart Fire system, one of Paul's most famous designs is the Breville IKON home appliance range.  The Ikon kettle has sold over 1.5 million kettles per year. Other designs he has created for every day use includes a Vodafone mobile phone, the Energizer 3-in1 flashlight, Johnson & Johnson tooth flosser, Midea air conditioners and many other consumer goods.
He has stated that his aim it to develop more mass-produced products which embrace environmental factors.

Professional experience

Paul is the CEO of  Cube Design China Limited. He now works in conjunction with large multinational Chinese companies, with a goal of helping to raise design standards in that country. His client list includes Midea, Joyoung, Shenzhen Breo, Top Electric Appliances, Saab Appliances, Fromone Homewares and many more.

In Sydney, he is the Co-Owner and a Director of Cube Industrial Design, where the clients include Breville, Blueye Eyewear, Johnson and Johnson, Hydro Surfing Products, Greentech products, Vodafone, Bang and Olufsen, Tupperware and Phillips.

Paul was also the Managing Director of	Think Product Design until 2007, as well as Senior Designer at Design Recourse International, where his projects included working with clients such as AGL, Eveready, Black and Decker, Netcomm, IBM Australia and Sun Moon Star.

Additional professional activities

Paul has spoken at worldwide forums, served on judging panels and has lectured in industrial design.

 2016 Guest Speaker of Istanbul Design Week
2016 Guest Speaker and Judge of Gold Panda Cultural Creativity and Design Award in Chengdu China
2015 Judge of CF Award
2015 IF Design Award Judge
2014 IF Design Award Judge
2012 Guest Speaker of IF Design Exhibition in Hainan China
 Honoured Guest speaker IODFCN design fair Conference China 2008
 Guest Speaker SOFA design forum 2008
 Guest Speaker ICIF forum 2006
 2006 Standards Australia Design Awards Judge
 2002 Standards Australia Design Awards Judge
 2002 Expert Design witness April - June
 2001 Newcastle University Judge
 1994 - 2006 University of Technology Sydney Professor – Industrial Design course (teaching Industrial design projects and Illustration to years 1- 4)
 1999 University of New South Wales, External Judge and Guest speaker
 1999 University of Technology Sydney, Guest speaker
 1995 University of New South Wales, lecturer – Industrial Design Masters course, Teaching Industrial Illustration

Awards and honors
2017
 Bork K781 Ceramic Kettle-IF Design Award
 Bork I780 Pump Iron-IF Design Award
2016
 Bork K780 Glass Kettle-IF Design Award
 Bork T780 Toaster-IF Design Award
 Bork X780 Bread Maker-IF Design Award
2015
 Bork Meat Mincer-IF Design Award
 Bork AA581 Double Adapter- Red Dot Design Award
 Breo Scalp Massager -Red Dot Design Award
 Mono electronic-Good Design Award
2014
 Kaibo Round Waffle Maker -Red Dot Design Award
 Breo Neck Massager- Good Design Award
 Breville Toaster- Red Dot Design Award
2013
 Breo iSee 4 Massager-IF Design Award
2012
 Hulton Intelligence Door Lock- Good Design Award
2011
 Breville Kettle- Red Dot Design Award
 Breville Tea Maker-Red Dot Design Award
2010
 The fire company Retro- Australia Home Beautiful Design Award
 Breo Mini Massage Set- Red Dot Design Award, Good Design Award
 Breville Smart Grill-Good Design Award
 Breville Variable Temp Kettle-Reddot, Good Design Award
 Joint Winner Red Dot Design awards Germany  (espresso machine)
2009
 Watch-dog Door Lock-Good Design Award
2008
 Breville Combo-Good Design Award
 Espresso machine-Red Dot Design Award
 Winner Australian international design awards
2007
 Breville IKON Juicer-Good Design Award
 Breville BES400 IKON Espresso-Reddot, Good Design Award, G-Mark, Australia Home Beautiful Design Award
 Joint Winner Bronze at the IDEA, (International Design Excellence Awards USA) consumer products 2007. (Breville blender)
 Winner Home beautiful awards 2007, & 2006 ( smart fire )
2006
 Ecosmart Vision- Interior Design Magazine’ s Best of Year “Roscoes” Award(USA), Australia Home Beautiful Design Award
 Breville BKE 450 Moda Kettle-IDEA, Good Design Award, Voted NO.1 in the Australian Newspaper People Choice Award
 Winner Home beautiful awards 2007, & 2006 ( smart fire )
2005
 Breville IKON Blender- Australia Home Beautiful Design Award
2004
 Breville IKON Kettle- Good Design Award
 Breville IKON Toaster- Good Design Award
 Breville IKON Kettle- Good Design Award
2002
 Hydro Sport- Good Design Award
2001
 Target Drill-Good Design Award
1999
 Blue-eye - Good Design Award
1998
 Compost Bin- Good Design Award

References

External links 
Red Dot Design awards:talk at product design:Manufacturers and designers of a wide variety of industrial products.
Breville
Midea:one of the largest white household appliance production bases and export bases in China.
Design Awards Australia
Breville awards

1962 births
Living people